The Federated Women's Institutes of Canada is an umbrella organization for Women's Institutes in Canada.

"The idea to form a national group was first considered in 1912. In 1914, however, when the war began the idea was abandoned. At the war's end, it was Miss Mary MacIssac, Superintendent of Alberta Women's Institute, who revived the idea. She realized the importance of organizing the rural women of Canada so they might speak as one voice for needed reforms, and the value of co-ordinating provincial groups for a more consistent organization. In February 1919, representatives of the provinces met in Winnipeg, Manitoba, to form the Federated Women's Institutes of Canada." - History of FWIC

See also 

Adelaide Hunter Hoodless Homestead
British Women's Institute
List of Canadian organizations with royal patronage
Women's rights in Canada
Royal Commission on the Status of Women
Erland Lee Museum

References

External links 
Federated Women's Institutes of Canada
Federated Women's Institutes of Ontario

Organizations based in Canada with royal patronage
Human rights organizations based in Canada
Women's organizations based in Canada